Olga Umnova is Russian-born British academic, lecturer in Theoretical Acoustics in the Acoustics Department at the University of Salford. In recognition of her contribution to the field of acoustics, she was awarded the prestigious Tyndall Medal by the Institute of Acoustics in 2010.

Umnova holds a degree in Applied Physics and Mathematics from the Moscow Institute of Physics and Technology and a PhD in Acoustics from General Physics Institute, Russian Academy of Science (1994). She has been a research fellow at the Open University, University of Hull and since 2004 she is an academic at the University of Salford.

She has been involved actively in the professional life of the acoustic community in the UK and overseas, serving as a member of the Institute of Acoustics (IOA), member of the Engineering and Physical Sciences Research Council (EPSRC) Peer Review College, Associate Editor of the Journal of Applied Acoustics and the Journal of Acta Acoutsica (United with Acustica).

External links
 University of Salford profile

References

Academics of the University of Salford
Moscow Institute of Physics and Technology alumni
Living people
Year of birth missing (living people)
Academics of the Open University
Academics of the University of Hull
British women academics
Russian women academics
Russian expatriates in the United Kingdom